The Rud Aero RA-3 is an American composite aerobatic training aircraft, produced by Rud Aero.

Design and development
The RA-3 is a single engine two-seat, side-by-side configuration, low wing, tricycle gear composite construction aircraft. The aircraft is built using carbon fiber construction throughout. The aircraft has a cambered training wing that can be exchanged for a constant chord symmetrical wing for advanced aerobatic training. The aircraft is designed to operate as an FAR Part 21.24 aircraft, with future modifications to meet American LSA standards.

Variants
RA-3
Base model
RA-3L 
LSA variant

Specifications (RA-3)

References

Aerobatic aircraft
Homebuilt aircraft